Web content development is the process of researching, writing, gathering, organizing, and editing information for publication on websites. Website content may consist of prose, graphics, pictures, recordings, movies, or other digital assets that could be distributed by a hypertext transfer protocol server, and viewed by a web browser.

Content developers and web developers
When the World Wide Web began, web developers either developed online content themselves, or modified existing documents and coded them into hypertext markup language (HTML). In time, the field of website development came to encompass many technologies, so it became difficult for website developers to maintain so many different skills. Content developers are specialized website developers who have content generation skills such as  graphic design, multimedia development, professional writing, and documentation. They can integrate content into new or existing websites without using information technology skills such as script language programming and database programming. 

Content developers or technical content developers can also be technical writers who produce technical documentation that helps people understand and use a product or service. This documentation includes online help, manuals, white papers, design specifications, developer guides, deployment guides, release notes, etc.

Search engine optimization
Content developers may also be search engine optimization specialists, or internet marketing professionals. High quality, unique content is what search engines are looking for. Content development specialists, therefore, have a very important role to play in the search engine optimization process. One issue currently plaguing the world of web content development is keyword-stuffed content which are prepared solely for the purpose of manipulating search engine rankings. The effect is that content is written to appeal to search engine (algorithms) rather than human readers. Search engine optimization specialists commonly submit content to article directories to build their website's authority on any given topic.  Most article directories allow visitors to republish submitted content with the agreement that all links are maintained.  This has become a method of search engine optimization for many websites today. If written according to SEO copywriting rules, the submitted content will bring benefits to the publisher (free SEO-friendly content for a webpage) as well as to the author (a hyperlink pointing to his/her website, placed on an SEO-friendly webpage).

New content types
Web content is no longer restricted to text. Search engines now index audio/visual media, including video, images, PDFs, and other elements of a web page. Website owners sometimes use content protection networks to scan for plagiarized content.

See also
 Web content
 Web content lifecycle
 Content marketing
 Search engine optimization
 Content designer
 Content management
 Content adaptation
 Professional writing
 Technical writer
 Web content management system

References

Web development
Web content